Eduardo Noriega Gómez (born 1 August 1973) is a Spanish film actor. He is known for his roles in two of Alejandro Amenábar's films: the multiple Goya Award-winning Tesis (Thesis) (1996) and Open Your Eyes  (1997). He also starred in The Wolf (Spanish:  El Lobo) (2004).  In the United States, Noriega is known for his role as Enrique in the political thriller Vantage Point (2008).

Early life and education
Noriega was born in Santander, Spain, to a Mexican father and a Spanish mother. He is the youngest of seven siblings and the only one who became an actor. As a child, he devoted himself to music. When he grew up he left his law degree and his love for music and moved to Madrid to become an actor.

Career
He acted in several short films by directors Amenábar, Mateo Gil and Carlos Montero and he appeared in a short role in the well-known Spanish film Stories from the Kronen (Spanish: Historias del Kronen). But it was not until Tesis that he had his first starring role in a film that became one of the most important successes in the history of Spanish films. Amenábar confessed in a T.T interview that at first he did not want Noriega in Tesis, thinking he was just a "pretty face", although his collaborators thought otherwise. In the end he called him again because he preferred him over the other actors in the casting. They became close friends and later worked on different projects together, including Open Your Eyes.

With Leonardo Sbaraglia, he appeared in Plata Quemada (English: Burnt Money) (2000), an Argentine film directed by Marcelo Piñeyro. Noriega went on to star in another Piñeyro film, The Method (Spanish: El Método (2005), reuniting with Plata Quemada co-star Pablo Echarri. He appeared as Jacinto in The Devil's Backbone (2001), a film directed by Guillermo del Toro and produced by Agustín Almodóvar and Pedro Almodóvar, about life in an orphanage in the last months of the Spanish Civil War. The film also stars Marisa Paredes and Federico Luppi.

He starred as the main actor in Novo (2002), a French film directed by Jean-Pierre Limosin, where he appeared completely nude.

In 2005, he played the lead role in the independent film Che Guevara produced and directed by Josh Evans.

Noriega appeared as Conde de Guadalmedina in Alatriste (2006). Agustín Díaz Yanes directed the film, starring Viggo Mortensen, Elena Anaya, Javier Cámara, Ariadna Gil, Blanca Portillo, and Juan Echanove. Alatriste is based on five novels written by Arturo Pérez-Reverte.

Noriega came under spotlight with Vicente Aranda's drama Lolita's Club (2007) where he portrayed Raúl Fuentes and Valentín Fuentes, twin brothers of opposite characters.

He starred in Vantage Point (2008), playing Enrique, a Spanish police officer assigned to protect the local mayor, and who plays an unintended central role in the investigation of the assassination of the American president. He portrayed an escaped drug lord in The Last Stand, starring Arnold Schwarzenegger.

Personal life
Noriega married his girlfriend of ten years, Trinidad Oteros, on February 8, 2011.
He speaks Spanish, English, French and Catalan fluently.

Filmography 

Television

References

External links
 
 

1973 births
Living people
Male actors of Mexican descent 
People from Santander, Spain
Actors from Cantabria
Spanish people of Mexican descent
20th-century Spanish male actors
21st-century Spanish male actors
Spanish male film actors
Chopard Trophy for Male Revelation winners